WRUF-LD, virtual channel 10 (VHF digital channel 5), is a low-power independent television station licensed to Gainesville, Florida, United States. Owned by the University of Florida, it is sister to Public Broadcasting Service (PBS) member WUFT (channel 5), National Public Radio (NPR) member WUFT-FM (89.1), and commercial radio stations WRUF (850 AM) and WRUF-FM (103.7). The five stations share studios at Weimer Hall on the University's campus; WRUF-LD's transmitter is located on Northwest 53rd Avenue in Gainesville.

On cable, WRUF-LD can be seen on Cox Communications channel 6 in Gainesville; this is reflected in the station's logo. It is also available on Cox Cable channel 20 in Ocala. Most of WRUF-LD's programming is devoted to local weather, with some news and sports coverage.

History

The station was granted a construction permit for analog broadcasting on VHF channel 10 on July 29, 1988 (after having applied for the channel in 1981), and was issued the call sign W10BR; it filed for a license to cover on November 27, 1989, which was granted on December 29. The callsign was changed to WLUF-LP in 1995.  As WLUF, the station served as a PBS member station, broadcasting mainly second runs of PBS and WUFT programming, plus telecourses for UF students. The station converted to digital broadcasting, becoming WLUF-LD, in 2010.

The station was relaunched as a commercially based 24-hour weather channel on June 1, 2011; this came after state funding to Florida's public radio and television stations was vetoed by Governor Rick Scott in May. The call letters had been changed to WRUF-LD, matching the University of Florida's commercially operated WRUF radio stations (850 AM, and 103.7 FM), on November 19, 2010.  Regular WLUF programming ended on May 23, 2011, with WRUF-LD carrying NASA TV's coverage of the final mission of Space Shuttle Endeavour in the interim.

WRUF-LD carries mostly 24/7 weather coverage with some news and sports coverage, as well as UF features and happenings.

Digital channels

See also
Channel 5 digital TV stations in the United States
Channel 5 low-power TV stations in the United States
Channel 6 branded TV stations in the United States
Channel 10 virtual TV stations in the United States

References

External links
 

University of Florida
RUF-LD
Television channels and stations established in 1989
Low-power television stations in the United States
1989 establishments in Florida
Independent television stations in the United States